Guelph Public Library is a public library system serving the city of Guelph, Ontario, Canada. The main library downtown, five branches, and a bookmobile (seven branches total) serve about 123,000 residents in Guelph. The current CEO is Steven Kraft.

Branches
Bullfrog Mall
Bookmobile
East Side
Main
Scottsdale
West End
Westminster

History
In 1883, the Guelph Public Library was the first public library in Ontario established under the Public Library Act of 1882. The collection of the Farmers and Mechanics Institute library, which had been a free public lending library since 1850, was contributed to the newly founded Guelph Public Library.

The first library building was completed in September 1905 at the corner of Norfolk and Paisley streets downtown, partly through a Carnegie Foundation grant of $24,000. The neo-classical (Beaux Art) structure, had been designed in 1902 by W. Frye Colwill. According to a University publication, "The library permitted free access, used the Dewey Decimal system classification, and provided a card catalogue. The motto, "Floreat Scientia" ("Let Knowledge Grow") was carved above the stone entrance. A special Guelph feature was its dome, one of the few built in this fashion in Canada". It was demolished in 1964 in spite of public opposition, and replaced with the current structure on Norfolk St.

A new public library may be built near the Baker St. parking lot, which is to be redeveloped as the Baker District. Preliminary discussions about a new main branch had taken place by summer 2017 with some decision expected to be made in 2018.  Construction is expected to begin in 2024.

References

Public libraries in Ontario
Buildings and structures in Guelph
Culture of Guelph
Education in Guelph
Libraries established in 1883
1883 establishments in Canada